The Moomba Adelaide Pipeline System is a natural gas pipeline delivering gas from the Cooper Basin gas wells near Moomba to Adelaide, with spur pipelines to Angaston and Whyalla. It can also receive gas from Southeastern Queensland through the QSN Link pipeline owned by APA Group.

The pipeline was developed by the Government of South Australia and commenced operation on 28 November 1969. It was privatised in 1995 and bought by Queensland Investment Corporation, the parent company of Epic Energy in April 2013.

The main lateral spurs are the one to Port Pirie and Whyalla and the one to Angaston. The Angaston spur can also feed gas into the Riverland Pipeline owned by Envestra, which supplies gas to Murray Bridge, Berri and Mildura.

There are also several loops at the southern end.

The Reeves Plains Power Station was in 2017 proposed to be constructed adjacent to the pipeline and draw gas directly from it. However, support had not been obtained by March 2019, when the project was one of 12 projects shortlisted in the Government of Australia's Underwriting New Generation Investments program.

References

Natural gas pipelines in Australia
Energy in South Australia
Pipelines in South Australia